Zippelia begoniifolia is the only species of the monotypic genus Zippelia, a genus of plants in the Piperaceae, the same botanical family as that of black pepper. The species has also been spelled as Z. begoniaefolia. It occurs in Borneo, Cambodia, southern-central and southeast mainland China as well as Hainan, Java, Laos, Peninsular Malaysia, the Philippines, Sumatra, Thailand and Vietnam.

The generic epithet commemorates Alexander Zippelius. Zippelius was a horticulturist and early collector of plants in Java and other islands of the region.

The genus name Zippelia has a confused taxonomic history, also having been used to place the parasitic plants now classified in the genus Rhizanthes by Ludwig Reichenbach.

References

Piperales genera
Piperaceae
Monotypic magnoliid genera